The Pt 2/4 H was a class of steam locomotive built by the firm of Krauss for the Royal Bavarian State Railways (Königlich Bayerische Staatsbahn) between 1906 and 1908. They were used on routes in Bavaria to haul light, fast passenger trains.

The vehicles all had a gravity-fed firebox with a hopper over the grate for one-man operation. It was possible to access the train directly from the locomotive via doors in the front and rear walls and gangways. On several engines, the Reichsbahn later made modifications to the driver's cab.

The Deutsche Reichsbahn took all engines of this type over. The last Pt 2/4 H locomotive was retired in 1948.

See also 
 Royal Bavarian State Railways
 List of Bavarian locomotives and railbuses

References

2-4-2T locomotives
Pt 2 4 H
Standard gauge locomotives of Germany
Krauss locomotives
Railway locomotives introduced in 1906
1′B1′ h2t locomotives
Passenger locomotives